Max Davidson (May 23, 1875 – September 4, 1950) was a German-American film actor known for his comedic Jewish persona during the silent film era. With a career spanning over thirty years, Davidson appeared in over 180 films.

Career
Born in Berlin to Jewish parents, Davidson emigrated to the United States in the 1890s where he began working in stock theater and vaudeville. He entered silent movies in 1912. He made a series of films featuring the character Izzy for Reliance Pictures Company in 1914. The films included Izzy Gets the Wrong Bottle, Izzy and His Rival, Izzy and the Diamond, How Izzy Stuck to His Post, How Izzy Was Saved, Izzy, the Detective, Izzy's Night Out, Izzy, the Operator, and Izzy and the Bandit.

By the mid-teens, Davidson had appeared in his first feature film, Edward Dillon's Don Quixote (1915), followed by D.W. Griffith's Intolerance, and Tod Browning's Puppets (both 1916).

He starred alongside a young Jackie Coogan in a pair of silent features, The Rag Man (1923) and Old Clothes (1925).

In 1923, he appeared in the Mack Sennett feature The Extra Girl with Mabel Normand, and in 1927 made a rare starring feature at Columbia, Pleasure Before Business, as well as playing a somewhat more serious role as a servant in the Pola Negri WW1 vehicle Hotel Imperial.

In 1926 he began working for Hal Roach, playing stereotypical Jewish comic characters. After being featured in the Mabel Normand comedy Raggedy Rose, Davidson was given a short-subject series of his own, appearing as a woebegone, put-upon fellow in such titles as Jewish-Prudence and  Don't Tell Everything. He was also featured in other Hal Roach series, including the "female Laurel and Hardy" shorts co-starring Anita Garvin and Marion Byron. Davidson's best-known starring shorts are Call of the Cuckoo (1927), featuring cameos by Stan Laurel, Oliver Hardy, and Charley Chase; and the recently revived Pass the Gravy (1928), deemed "culturally significant" by the Library of Congress and selected for preservation in the National Film Registry.

Career decline
Max Davidson's exaggerated Jewish caricature was popular enough with audiences to sustain a string of silent shorts, but the coming of sound gave Davidson a voice. Although Davidson's native German accent was not so thick as to ruin his chances in talking pictures, his dialect gave his screen character a new and potentially offensive dimension, and Hal Roach forestalled any protests by discontinuing the series entirely. Davidson did appear in a few of Roach's earliest talkies, including the Edgar Kennedy short Hurdy Gurdy (1929) and the Our Gang short Moan and Groan, Inc. (1929). But Davidson's established ethnic character was too broad to survive as a starring attraction, and he spent the rest of his career playing bit roles almost exclusively. 

Davidson's largest role in sound films was as cowboy Tom Tyler's good-natured Jewish sidekick in the 1936 western feature Roamin' Wild. He was still familiar to the movie-comedy community; when Charlie Chaplin needed ethnic types to portray the residents of a Jewish ghetto in The Great Dictator (1940), Max Davidson was cast. He continued to play ethnic shopkeepers, opposite The Three Stooges in No Census, No Feeling (1940) and The East Side Kids in Clancy Street Boys (1943), among several other films. 

His final screen appearance was in the 1945 Clark Gable film Adventure. Davidson died on September 4, 1950 in Woodland Hills, Los Angeles, California.

Partial filmography

References

External links

1875 births
1950 deaths
Emigrants from the German Empire to the United States
German male film actors
German male silent film actors
19th-century German Jews
Hal Roach Studios actors
Male actors from Berlin
Silent film comedians
Vaudeville performers
Hal Roach Studios short film series
20th-century German male actors
Jewish American male actors
Jewish German male actors
20th-century American comedians
Comedians from California